The 1912 Mürefte earthquake occurred at 03:29 local time on 9 August. It had an estimated magnitude of 7.4  and a maximum intensity of X (Extreme) on the Modified Mercalli intensity scale, causing from 216–3000 casualties.

See also
List of earthquakes in 1912
List of earthquakes in Turkey

References

External links

1912 Mürefte
1912 in the Ottoman Empire 
1912
1912 earthquakes
1912 disasters in the Ottoman Empire